Miss Sally's Party is a 1940 ballet composition in eight-movements by American composer William Grant Still. A related libretto was written by Verna Arvey, wife of composer Still. The ballet was first performed on May 2, 1941, and is about nineteen minutes long.

Overview
A description of the ballet is well presented as follows:

Movements
The ballet is in eight movements as follows:

See also
 List of ballets by title
 List of jazz-influenced classical compositions

References

Further reading

External links
 Miss Sally's Party (selection; 05:13)
 Miss Sally's Party (complete; 19:06)

Compositions by William Grant Still
1940 compositions